Izadkhast (also Romanized as Īzadkhvāst and Īzad Khvast; also known as Īzad Khast, Yazd-e Khāst, Yazd-e Khvāst, and Yezd-i-Khast; also known as Samīrum) is a city in the Central District of Abadeh County, Fars Province, Iran.  At the 2006 census, its population was 7,366, in 1,803 families.

It is the first city in Fars Province on the Isfahan-Shiraz Highway.

The Complex of Izadkhast is located in the Fars Province of Iran, roughly 135 km south of Isfahan.  The complex consists of Izad-Khast Castle, a caravanserai, and a Safavid-period bridge. The castle structure is of particular interest due to the different architectural styles incorporated into the construction of the building, including Sassanid and Qajar periods. The  architecture of the castle is unique to Izadkhast, and only comparisons in building materials can be made to other sites in the region.

History
In 1779 Zaki Khan of the Zand Dynasty committed such atrocities here that his own men decided to murder him.

World Heritage Status 
This site was added to the UNESCO World Heritage Tentative List on August 9, 2007 in the Cultural category.

References

Populated places in Abadeh County
Cities in Fars Province
Sasanian cities